Shui Junshao (水鈞韶,  1878 – 25 August 1961), courtesy name Meng Geng, a native of Funing, Jiangsu, was a diplomat from the Republic of China and a member of the old transportation department . He was a member of the Revolutionary Committee of the Chinese Kuomintang. In 1925, he served as the consul general of the Chinese consulate in Leningrad, USSR.

References

Chinese diplomats
1878 births
1961 deaths